Greatest Hits is a compilation album by Pat Benatar, released in June 2005 by Capitol Records. The album contains 20 digitally remastered tracks from Benatar's first seven studio albums, including the studio recording "Love Is a Battlefield" from the 1983 live album Live from Earth. The compilation peaked at No. 47, lasting 15 weeks on the Billboard 200 album chart.

Track listing

Charts

References

Personnel 

 Evren Göknar - Mastering Engineer

2005 greatest hits albums
Pat Benatar albums
Albums produced by Mike Chapman
Albums produced by Keith Olsen
Capitol Records compilation albums